Bougainville is an autonomous region in Papua New Guinea. At regional level, Bougainville elects a President and a House of Representatives. A non-binding independence referendum was held in 2019. In this referendum, 98% of voters voted in favour of independence.

Presidential elections
2008 Bougainvillean presidential election
2010 Bougainvillean presidential election
2015 Bougainvillean general election
2020 Bougainvillean general election

Legislative elections
2005 Bougainvillean general election
2010 Bougainvillean general election
2015 Bougainvillean general election
2020 Bougainvillean general election

Referendums

2019 Bougainvillean independence referendum

See also

Elections in Papua New Guinea

References